The San Diego State Aztecs football statistical leaders are individual statistical leaders of the San Diego State Aztecs football program in various categories, including passing, rushing, receiving, total offense, all-purpose yardage, defensive stats, kicking, and scoring. Within those areas, the lists identify single-game, single-season, and career leaders. The Aztecs represent San Diego State University in the NCAA's Mountain West Conference (MW).

Although San Diego State began competing in intercollegiate football in 1921, the school's official record book considers the "modern era" to have begun in 1947. Records from before this year are often incomplete and inconsistent, and they are generally not included in these lists.

These lists are dominated by more recent players for several reasons:
 Since 1947, seasons have increased from 10 games to 11 and then 12 games in length.
 Additionally, San Diego State has been grouped in the same MW football division as Hawaii since divisional play began in 2013, meaning that it plays at Hawaii every other year. This is relevant because the NCAA allows teams that play at Hawaii in a given season to schedule 13 regular-season games instead of the normal 12. However, the Aztecs have not chosen to do so in any season since the start of divisional play.
 Since 2013, the MW has held a conference championship game. The Aztecs have appeared in this game twice (2015 and 2016), giving players in those seasons an extra game to accumulate statistics.
 The NCAA didn't allow freshmen to play varsity football until 1972 (with the exception of the World War II years), allowing players to have four-year careers.
 Bowl games only began counting toward single-season and career statistics in 2002. The Aztecs have played in eight bowl games since this decision (all since 2010), giving many recent players an extra game to accumulate statistics.

These lists are updated through the end of the 2017 season. Of particular note is running back Donnel Pumphrey, who leads the entire Division I FBS in rushing yards.

Passing

Passing yards

Passing touchdowns

Rushing

Rushing yards

Rushing touchdowns

Receiving

Receptions

Receiving yards

Receiving touchdowns

Total offense
Total offense is the sum of passing and rushing statistics. It does not include receiving or returns.

Total offense yards

Touchdowns responsible for
"Touchdowns responsible for" is the official NCAA term for combined passing and rushing touchdowns.

All-purpose yardage
All-purpose yardage is the sum of all yards credited to a player who is in possession of the ball. It includes rushing, receiving, and returns, but does not include passing.

Statistics are from the 2017 San Diego State football record book as updated to reflect the 2017 season.

Defense

Interceptions

Tackles

Sacks

Kicking

Field goals made

Field goal percentage

Scoring

Points

Touchdowns
Unlike the "Total touchdowns" lists in the "Total offense" section, these lists count touchdowns scored. Accordingly, these lists include rushing, receiving, and return touchdowns, but not passing touchdowns.

References

San Diego State

Lists of California State University people